Yuzhnoye Medvedkovo District is a territorial division (a district, or raion) in North-Eastern Administrative Okrug, one of the 125 in the federal city of Moscow, Russia. It is located in the north of the federal city. As of the 2010 Census, the total population of the district was 81,986.

As a municipal division, the district is incorporated as Yuzhnoye Medvedkovo Municipal Okrug.

References

Notes

Sources

Districts of Moscow
North-Eastern Administrative Okrug